Subsaxibacter arcticus is a Gram-negative, aerobic and rod-shaped bacterium from the genus of Subsaxibacter which has been isolated from intertidal sand from Kongsfjorden in Svalbard.

References

Flavobacteria
Bacteria described in 2016